A bogatyr or vityaz is a stock character in medieval East Slavic legends, akin to a Western European knight-errant. Bogatyrs appear mainly in Rus' epic poems—bylinas. Historically, they came into existence during the reign of Vladimir the Great (Grand Prince of Kiev from 980 to 1015) as part of his elite warriors (druzhina), akin to Knights of the Round Table. Tradition describes bogatyrs as warriors of immense strength, courage and bravery, rarely using magic while fighting enemies in order to maintain the "loosely based on historical fact" aspect of bylinas. They are characterized as having resounding voices, with patriotic and religious pursuits, defending Rus' from foreign enemies (especially nomadic Turkic steppe-peoples or Finno-Ugric tribes in the period prior to the Mongol invasions) and their religion. In modern Russian, the word bogatyr labels a courageous hero, an athlete or a physically strong man.

Etymology

The word bogatyr is not of Slavic origin. 
It derives from the  Turco-Mongolic baghatur "hero", which is itself of uncertain origin.
The term is recorded from at least the 8th century.

Gerard Clauson suggests that bağatur was in origin a Hunnic proper name, specifically that of Modu Chanyu. Alternatively, a suggestion cited in the Brockhaus and Efron Encyclopedic Dictionary that the term may be related to the Sanskrit bhagadhara. 

The first known use of the word in a Russian context occurred in Stanisław Sarnicki's book Descriptio veteris et novae Poloniae cum divisione ejusdem veteri et nova (A description of the Old and the New Poland with the old, and a new division of the same), printed in 1585 in Cracow (at Aleksy Rodecki's printing house), which states: "Rossi ... de heroibus suis, quos Bohatiros id est semideos vocant, aliis persuadere conantur." ("Russians ... try to convince others about their heroes whom they call Bogatirs, meaning demigods.")

The term vityaz comes from Proto-Slavic *vitędzь, from Proto-Germanic *wikinga through a West Germanic intermediary. The earliest attested form is Old English wicing, "pirate", whence modern English viking. This in turn probably comes from Latin vicus with the Germanic suffix *-inga-, indicating belonging. In Germanic and Latin sources, the word has negative connotations. The circumstances of borrowing, and how it came to mean "hero" in Slavic, remain unclear.

Overview 

 
Many Rus epic poems, called Bylinas, prominently featured stories about these heroes, as did several chronicles, including the 13th century Galician–Volhynian Chronicle. Some bogatyrs are presumed to be historical figures, while others, like the giant Svyatogor, are purely fictional and possibly descend from Slavic pagan mythology. The epic poems are usually divided into three collections: the Mythological epics, older stories that were told before Kiev-Rus was founded and Christianity was brought to the region, and included magic and the supernatural; the Kievan cycle, that contains the largest number of bogatyrs and their stories (IIya Muromets, Dobrynya Nikitich, and Aloysha Popovich); and the Novgorod cycle, focused on Sadko and Vasily Buslayev, that depicts everyday life in Novgorod.

Many of the stories about bogatyrs revolve around the court of Vladimir I of Kiev (958–1015) and are called the Kievan Cycle. The most notable bogatyrs or vityazes served at his court: the trio of Alyosha Popovich, Dobrynya Nikitich and Ilya Muromets. Each of them tends to be known for a certain character trait: Alyosha Popovich for his wits, Dobrynya Nikitich for his courage, and Ilya Muromets for his physical and spiritual power and integrity, and for his dedication to the protection of his homeland and people. Most of those bogatyrs adventures are fictional, and often included fighting dragons, giants and other mythical creatures. However, the bogatyrs themselves were often based on real people. Historical prototypes of both Dobrynya Nikitich (the warlord Dobrynya) and Ilya Muromets are proven to have existed.
 
The Novgorod Republic produced a specific kind of hero, an adventurer rather than a noble warrior. The most prominent examples were Sadko and Vasily Buslayev who became part of the Novgorod Cycle of folk epics.
 
Mythological epics rooted in the supernatural and shamanism, and related to paganism. The most prominent heroes in these epics are Svyatogor and Volkh Vseslavyevich; they are commonly called the "Elder Bogatyrs".
 
Later notable bogatyrs also include those who fought by Alexander Nevsky's side, including Vasily Buslayev and those who fought in the Battle of Kulikovo.
 
Bogatyrs and their heroic tales have influenced many figures in Russian Literature and Art, such Alexander Pushkin, who wrote the 1820 epic fairy tale poem Ruslan and Ludmila, Victor Vasnetsov, and Andrei Ryabushkin whose artworks depict many bogatyrs from the different cycles of folk epics. Bogatyrs are also mentioned in wonder tales in a more playful light as in Foma Berennikov, a story in Aleksandr Afanas'ev's collection of tales called Russian Fairy Tales featuring Alyosha Popovich and Ilya Muromets.

Red Medusa Animation Studio, based in Russia, created an animated parody of the bogatyrs called "Three Russian Bogaturs," in which the titular characters—strong and tenacious, but not overly bright—prevail against various opponents from fairy tales, pop culture, and modern life.

Female bogatyr 

 
Many of the more well-known polianitsas are wives to the famous male bogatyrs, such as Nastas'ya Nikulichna, the wife of Dobrynya Nikitich. The female bogatyr matches the men in strength and bravery with stories detailing instances where they save their husbands and outwit the enemy. They are often seen working with the heroes in tales that mention their presence.

Famous bogatyrs 
Most bogatyrs are fictional, but are believed to be based on historical prototypes:
 Ilya Muromets, regarded as the greatest of the bogatyrs, from Murom
 Dobrynya Nikitich – from Ryazan (based on a historical warlord of Vladimir I)
 Alyosha Popovich ("Alyosha the Priest's Son") – from Rostov, a trickster among bogatyrs who is best known for his wits.
 Evpaty Kolovrat  bogatyr described in The Tale of the Destruction of Ryazan, he fought an army of the Mongol ruler Batu Khan
 Svyatogor, a giant knight who bequeathed his strength to Ilya Muromets (purely fictional)
 Vasily Buslayev of Novgorod
 Anika the Warrior
 Duke Stepanovich
 Dunaj Ivanovich
 Volga Svyatoslavovich (possibly based on Oleg of Novgorod or Vseslav of Polotsk)
 Sukhman The Bogatyr
 Nikita the Furrier
 Mikula Selyaninovich ("Mikula the Villager's Son")
 
Some of the historical warriors also entered folklore and became known as bogatyrs:
 Gavrila Alexich of Novgorod, who served Alexander Nevsky in Battle of Neva (historical)
 Ratmir of Novgorod, who served Alexander Nevsky in Battle of Neva (historical)
 Peresvet, who sacrificed himself against the Tatars at the Battle of Kulikovo (historical)

Bogatyrs in films
Films by Alexander Ptushko:
 Sadko (Садко, 1952)
 Ilya Muromets (Илья Муромец, 1956)
 Ruslan and Ludmila (Руслан и Людмила, 1972), based on a fantasy poem of the same name by Alexander Pushkin.
 Soyuzmultfilm animated films (directed by Ivan Aksenchuk):
Ilya Muromets (1975)
Ilya Muromets and Nightingale the Robber (1978)
Melnitsa Animation series The Three Bogatyrs:
 Alyosha Popovich and Tugarin the Serpent (Алёша Попович и Тугарин Змей, 2004)
 Dobrynya Nikitich and Zmey Gorynych (Добрыня Никитич и Змей Горыныч, 2006)
 Ilya Muromets and Nightingale the Robber (Илья Муромец и Соловей-Разбойник, 2007)
 The Three Bogatyrs and Shamakhan Queen (Три богатыря и Шамаханская царица, 2010)
 The Three Bogatyrs on Distant Shores (Три богатыря на дальних берегах, 2012)
 The Three Bogatyrs: Course of the horse (Три богатыря: Ход конём)
 The Three Bogatyrs and the Sea King (Три богатыря и Морской царь)
Other films:
Alexander Nevsky (Александр Невский, 1938) by Sergei Eisenstein. Although based on real history, the film also shows a strong bylina influence and features bylina bogatyr Vasily Buslayev as a secondary character.
The Battle of Kerzhenets (1971)
 Vasilisa Mikulishna (1975, by Roman Davydov), an animated adaptation of a bylina of the same name. 
Prince Vladimir (Князь Владимир, 2006) also combines real medieval history with fantasy and folklore.
Last Knight (2017), a comedy film that deconstructs Russian folklore.

Bogatyrs in books
Books by Jennifer Estep
Crimson Frost (2013)
Midnight Frost (2013)
Killer Frost (2014)
 Books By Robin Bridges
 The Katerina Trilogy (The Gather Storm (2012), The Unfailing Light (2012), The Morning Star (2013))
 Books by John Conroe
Summer Reign (2018)

See also 
 Baghatur
 Bylina, East Slavic epic poetry
 Knight-errant
 Slavic mythology
 Victor Vasnetsov (1848–1926), Russian folk revivalist painter, famous for his depictions of bogatyrs.
 Bogatyr class cruiser, a group of protected cruisers built for the Imperial Russian Navy in 1898–1907, named for its lead ship Bogatyr
 The Bogatyr Gates, a movement from Mussorgsky's piano suite "Pictures at an Exhibition".

References

Citations

Sources

 Богатыри и витязи Русской земли: По былинам, сказаниям и песням. (1990) Moscow: "Moskovsky Rabochy" publishers 
 Ivanova, T. G., and James Bailey. An Anthology of Russian Folk Epics. Braille Jymico Inc., 2006.
 

Kievan Rus culture
Russian folklore

Ukrainian folklore